Abdul Aziz bin Mat Kiram is a Malaysian politician and currently serves as Pahang State Executive Councillor.

Election Results

Honours
 :
 Officer of the Order of the Defender of the Realm (KMN) (2007)
 :
 Knight Companion of the Order of the Crown of Pahang (DIMP) – Dato’ (2009)
 Knight Companion of the Order of Sultan Ahmad Shah of Pahang (DSAP) – Dato’ (2018)

References

United Malays National Organisation politicians
Members of the Pahang State Legislative Assembly
Pahang state executive councillors
21st-century Malaysian politicians
Officers of the Order of the Defender of the Realm 
Living people
Year of birth missing (living people)

People from Pahang
Malaysian people of Malay descent